Elie Rustom (born 2 May 1987) is a Lebanese basketball player currently playing for Homenetmen in the Lebanese Basketball League. He is also a member of the Lebanon national basketball team. He previously played with Blue Stars.

Basketball career
Rustom started to play basketball with Blue Stars youth team. He played two years for the youth team. In 2007 he signed with Al Mouttahed Tripoli.

In 2009 Rustom was called for the national team and participated in the 2009 William Jones Cup but was not called up to the final squad.

In 2010 he was also called by the national team. He played in 2010 William Jones Cup and FIBA Asia Stanković Cup 2010. He was in the starting 5 in all Lebanon's games in FIBA Asia Stanković Cup 2010 and also the 2010 FIBA World Championship. He was in the starting 5 for Mouttahed during the 2011 final four under coach Paul Caughter.

In 2011 he was called to the national team but he was injured during the preparations for the 2011 FIBA Asia Championship and could not make it to the final squad.

In 2012 Rustom signed for Lebanese Sagesse.

In 2016 he returned to his boyhood club Mouttahed, after spending four years with the Sagesse.

In 2017 he signed with Champville.

In 2018 Rustom sign with the defending champions Homenetmen.

References

1987 births
Living people
Lebanese men's basketball players
Sportspeople from Beirut
Shooting guards
Small forwards
2010 FIBA World Championship players
Sagesse SC basketball players
21st-century Lebanese people